The Duet technical routine competition of the 2022 European Aquatics Championships was held on 15 August 2022.

Results
The preliminary round was held on 15 August at 09:30.

References

Artistic